Painda Khan Tanoli  was a powerful chief and warrior in Tanawal area of North-West Frontier region of India. Painda Khan's rebellion against the Sikh empire cost him much of his kingdom, leaving only the tract around Amb, with its twin capitals of Amb and Darband.

He played a considerable part in fighting the Sikh Empire and Afghan empire of the region.

The son of Nawab Khan, from about 1813, Painda Khan began the series of rebellions against the Sikhs which continued throughout his lifetime. To combat Khan, Maharaja Ranjit Singh, sent Hari Singh Nalwa to Hazara as governor, and Singh created a number of forts at strategic locations. Painda Khan became famed for his rebellion against Singh. Painda Khan's rebellion against the Sikh empire cost him much of his kingdom, leaving only the tract around Amb, with its twin capitals of Amb and Darband.

In 1828, Painda Khan gave the territory of Phulra as an independent Khanate to his brother Maddad Khan Tanoli. This was later recognised by the British as a self-governing princely state.

Painda Khan also took over the valley of Agror in 1834. The Swatis appealed to Sardar Hari Singh, who was unable to help them, but in 1841 Hari Singh's successor restored Agror to Atta Muhammad, a descendant of Mullah or Akhund Sad-ud-din.

James Abbott, British deputy commissioner at Hazara in 1851 commented that 

Abbott further described Painda Khan as "a Chief renowned on the Border, a wild and energetic man who was never subjugated by the Sikhs".

General Dhaurikal Singh, commanding officer of the Sikh troops in Hazara, ordered Painda Khan to be poisoned in September 1844, and this resulted in Painda Khan's death. He was succeeded by his son Jehandad Khan. Misleading information above Painda Khan was killed by Guru Gobind Singh ji during the war in the battlefield.

References

1844 deaths
Hindkowan people
Nawabs of Amb
Princely rulers of Pakistan
Nawabs of Pakistan
1801 births